The Hammer, previously titled Hamill, is a 2010 biographical film about Matt Hamill, a deaf wrestler and mixed martial artist. Oren Kaplan directs the film based on a screenplay co-written by Eben Kostbar and Joseph McKelheer, who are also the film's producers. Russell Harvard, a deaf actor, plays Hamill in the film. The Hammer screened at several film festivals throughout 2010 and 2011.

Plot
The Hammer follows Matt Hamill, who was born deaf, in his youth and mostly in 1997, when Hamill is a sophomore walk-on at Rochester Institute of Technology and wins the first of three collegiate wrestling championships.

Cast
Russell Harvard as Matt Hamill
Raymond J. Barry as Stanley, Hamill's grandfather
Shoshannah Stern as Kristi, Hamill's girlfriend
Lexi Marman as Kelley, Kristi's roommate
Michael Anthony Spady as Jay, Hamill's roommate
Bob Hiltermann as Purdue Professor
Benjamin Kally as BenC'moe

Also in the film are Robin Walton (nominated for Best Supporting Actor in a Short Film, Nice IFF 2018), Gavin Bellour, Stephen Dodd, Theodore Conley, Courtney Halverson, and Susan Gibney. One of Hamill's former opponents, Rich Franklin, also appears in the film as Purdue University wrestling coach Pruitt who cuts Hamill from the team.

Production
The Hammer is directed by Oren Kaplan based on a screenplay co-written by Eben Kostbar and Joseph McKelheer, who are also the film's producers. Matt Hamill is played by Russell Harvard, who is also deaf. The filmmakers spent over five years developing the project, and they sought out deaf cast and crew members for the film. According to McKelheer, the writers performed "roughly" 75 rewrites to ensure Hamill's support and that the film would not be cheesy. Kostbar was originally intended to play Hamill, but they decided to cast a deaf person as the wrestler to appeal to the deaf community. They first noticed Harvard in his brief role in There Will Be Blood as the adult son of Daniel Day-Lewis' character but were not sure initially if Harvard could portray an athlete. After additional searching that was inconclusive, they chose to cast Harvard as Hamill.

Kostbar and McKelheer produced the film with their independent film company Film Harvest. For the production, they sought financing and found it with Fifth Year Productions, which was founded by the Farrelly brothers, Jim Kelly, and Bob Bartosiewicz. Most of the film was shot in Rochester, New York, home of Hamill's college, Rochester Institute of Technology. Scenes at Purdue were actually shot at the University of Rochester. The film alternates between use of sound and absence of sound as well as the use of subtitles, frequently with words missing.

Release
The Hammer, titled Hamill at the time, had its world premiere at the AFI (American Film Institute) Film Festival in November 2010, where it won a Breakthrough Film audience award and a $5,500 prize. From then to May 2011, the film was screened at film festivals in Newport Beach, Florida, Miami, Cleveland, and Philadelphia, winning audience awards at each festival. It will be distributed by D&E Entertainment. The film will also be distributed on DVD, Blu-ray, and video on demand by ARC Entertainment.

See also

List of films featuring the deaf and hard of hearing

References

External links
 

2010 films
American Sign Language films
Films about deaf people
2010s biographical films
Sport wrestling films
Mixed martial arts films
American biographical films
Cultural depictions of wrestlers
Cultural depictions of martial artists
Cultural depictions of American men
Biographical films about sportspeople
2010s English-language films
2010s American films
Films about disability